Monica Reinach (born 29 September 1966) is a former professional tennis player from South Africa.

Biography
A doubles specialist from Pretoria, Reinach competed on the professional tour in the 1980s. She is the elder sister of Elna Reinach, with whom she made the round of 16 of the women's doubles at the 1986 Wimbledon Championships. In 1987 she reached a career best doubles ranking of 75 in the world. She was a member of three World TeamTennis title winning teams, with Charlotte Heat in 1987 and 1988, then at the San Antonio Racquets in 1989. A knee injury caused the end of her professional tennis career.

She is married to South African former top 20 tennis player Christo van Rensburg. The couple live in Austin, Texas.

ITF finals

Doubles (10–3)

References

External links
 
 

1966 births
Living people
South African female tennis players
Sportspeople from Pretoria
South African emigrants to the United States
White South African people